Sandra Venkata Veeraiah is an Indian Politician (4 Times MLA) who is the current MLA from Sathupalli,  Telangana.

Venkata Veeraiah came from a Poor Dalit family and became an MLA at the age of 25 in 1994.

Career 
He was elected as MLA from CPM Party for Palair constituency of Andhra Pradesh Legislative Assembly  in 1994.

He was the in charge  of CPM Party for Palair constituency in 1999.

He was the in charge of Telugu Desam Party for Palair constituency in 2004.

He was elected as MLA from Telugu Desam Party for Sathupally constituency of Andhra Pradesh Legislative Assembly in 2009.

He was elected as MLA from Telugu Desam Party for Sathupally constituency of Telangana Legislative Assembly in 2014.

He was  elected as Tirumala Tirupati Devasthanam Board Member three times (2016, 2017, 2018).

He was a vice-president of National Telugu Desam Party for 2018.

He was elected as MLA from Telugu Desam Party for Sathupally constituency of Telangana Legislative Assembly in 2018 and later joined the Telangana Rashtra Samithi.

References

Telangana MLAs 2014–2018
Living people
Telugu Desam Party politicians
Indian prisoners and detainees
People from Khammam district
Indian politicians convicted of crimes
1968 births
Telangana MLAs 2018–2023

2.https://twitter.com/SandraMLA